The Soo Line Railroad  is the primary United States railroad subsidiary of the Canadian Pacific Railway , one of seven U.S. Class I railroads, controlled through the Soo Line Corporation. Although it is named for the Minneapolis, St. Paul and Sault Ste. Marie Railroad (MStP&SSM), which was commonly known as the Soo Line after the phonetic spelling of Sault, it was formed in 1961 by the consolidation of that company with two other CP subsidiaries: The Duluth, South Shore and Atlantic Railway, and the Wisconsin Central Railway. It is also the successor to other Class I railroads, including the Minneapolis, Northfield and Southern Railway (acquired 1982) and the Chicago, Milwaukee, St. Paul and Pacific Railroad (Milwaukee Road, acquired at bankruptcy in 1985). On the other hand, a large amount of mileage was spun off in 1987 to Wisconsin Central Ltd., now part of the Canadian National Railway. The Soo Line Railroad and the Delaware and Hudson Railway, CP's other major subsidiary (before the 2008 DM&E acquisition), presently do business as the Canadian Pacific Railway. Most equipment has been repainted into the CP scheme, but the U.S. Surface Transportation Board groups all of CP's U.S. subsidiaries under the Soo Line name for reporting purposes. The Minneapolis headquarters are located in the Canadian Pacific Plaza building, having moved from the nearby Soo Line Building.

System description 

The company's main line begins at Portal, North Dakota, on the Canada–U.S. border, and extends southeast along former MStP&SSM trackage to the Twin Cities (Minneapolis–Saint Paul). Ex-Milwaukee Road trackage takes the Soo Line from the Twin Cities to Chicago via Milwaukee. Between Chicago and Detroit, where the CP-owned Detroit River Tunnel connects back into Canada, the Soo Line has trackage rights over the Norfolk Southern Railway and haulage rights over CSX Transportation.

Major branches include a connection from the border at Noyes, Minnesota, to Glenwood and, until it was sold to the Indiana Rail Road in 1983, a line from Chicago to Louisville, Kentucky.

Through trackage rights over the BNSF Railway, the Soo Line also serves Duluth from the Twin Cities.

History  

The present Soo Line Railroad was incorporated in Minnesota on October 19, 1949, as the Duluth, South Shore and Atlantic Railroad, as part of the plan for reorganizing the Duluth, South Shore and Atlantic Railway (DSA) and subsidiary Mineral Range Railroad. When CP consolidated several subsidiaries on January 1, 1961, it used this company to merge the Minneapolis, St. Paul and Sault Ste. Marie Railroad and the Wisconsin Central Railway into, and renamed it to the present name, the Soo Line Railroad. The Soo Line gained control of the Minneapolis, Northfield and Southern Railway (MNS), a Twin Cities area shortline railroad, in June 1982.

Passenger service was mostly eliminated by the 1961 merger, but several trains remained for a few more years. These were a Saint Paul to Duluth daytime train known only as Trains 62 and 63 (discontinued June 1961), the overnight Chicago to Duluth Laker and its Saint Paul connection (both discontinued January 15, 1965), the Twin Cities to Winnipeg Winnipeger (discontinued March 25, 1967), and the Saint Paul to Portal, North Dakota Soo-Dominion that during the summer, ran through to Vancouver via a connection with Canadian Pacific's The Dominion at Moose Jaw. It was discontinued in December 1963, and the western Canada cars were handled on the Winnipeger for two more summers before they too were pulled. The Soo Line's last passenger train was the Copper Country Limited, a joint service with the Milwaukee Road inherited from the Duluth, South Shore and Atlantic. This Chicago-Champion-Calumet service was discontinued May 8, 1968. In addition, there were several mixed trains, with additional ones created to enable the discontinuance of the Saint Paul to Portal passenger train. Some mixed train services gained notoriety because passengers were conveyed in one direction only.

In 1984, CP incorporated the Soo Line Corporation in Minnesota as a holding company, exchanging stock in December to give the Soo Line Corporation total control over the railroad. Two months later, on February 19, 1985, the Soo Line purchased the property of the bankrupt Chicago, Milwaukee, St. Paul and Pacific Railroad and assigned it to a newly created subsidiary, The Milwaukee Road, Inc. This company and the MN&S were both merged into the Soo Line Railroad effective January 1, 1986. To cut costs, the Soo Line created the Lake States Transportation Division (LSTD) on February 10, 1986 to operate the less-important lines, including the ex-Wisconsin Central line between Chicago and the Twin Cities. Unable to implement its proposed labor rule changes, the Soo Line sold the approximately  LSTD to a new regional railroad, Wisconsin Central Ltd., in 1987 for $133 million. (The WC folded into the Canadian National Railway in 2001). In 1990, CP gained full control of the Soo Line Corporation, of which it had previously owned about 56% of the common stock. In the 2000s, the Soo line was consolidated into CP. Only a few Soo Line locomotives remain in the old paint scheme; most have been repainted into CP paint or scrapped. Today, the Milwaukee Road and Soo Line's trackage make up the historically logical route of the Canadian Pacific Railway.

Named passenger trains 
The railroad ran several long distance named trains. 
 Laker, Minneapolis, Minnesota – Duluth, Minnesota – Ashland, Wisconsin
 Soo-Dominion, Chicago, Illinois – Vancouver, British Columbia
 Winnipeger, Saint Paul, Minnesota – Winnipeg, Manitoba

Presidents 
The Presidents of the Soo Line Railroad were:
 Leonard H. Murray, 1961–1978, previously President of the Duluth, South Shore and Atlantic Railway
 Thomas M. Beckley, 1978–1983
 Dennis Miles Cavanaugh, 1983–1986, 1987–1989
 Robert C. Gilmore, 1986–1987
 Edwin V. Dodge, 1989–1996

Remaining locomotives

Preserved 

Some of the railroad's diesel locomotives have been preserved: 
 500, an EMD FP7A, on display in Ladysmith, Wisconsin.
 700, an EMD GP30, at the Lake Superior Railroad Museum in Duluth, Minnesota. Restored for use on their North Shore Scenic Railroad.
 703, an EMD GP30, and 991, a Barney and Smith heavyweight passenger car, at the Colfax Railroad Museum in Colfax, Wisconsin.
 715, an EMD GP30, at the National Railroad Museum in Ashwaubenon, Wisconsin, although it wears a Wisconsin Central Ltd. paint scheme.
 2500, an EMD FP7A, at the Lake Superior Railroad Museum in Duluth. Also restored for use on their North Shore Scenic Railroad.

In addition, a number of the railroad's 145 steel cabooses have been preserved.

Active 

As time passes, more Soo Line locomotives are being repainted into the Canadian Pacific red paint scheme. A total of nine Soo Line locomotives still remain in service in their original paint that are operated by CP.
 EMD GP38-2s 4402, 4410, 4411, 4412, 4413, 4416, 4438, and 4448 in the "Hockey Stick" paint scheme
 EMD GP39-2 4598 in the "Candy Apple Red" paint scheme (ex-KCCX 793)
In addition, some Soo Line EMD SD60 locomotives were sold to leasing company CIT Group (CEFX), which were then patched over but still remained in the Soo Line "Hockey Stick" paint scheme. The three locomotives that remain in Soo Line paint are 6002, 6007, and 6020.

In storage 
Some Soo Line locomotives are in storage in various rail yards, inactive and waiting to be scrapped or sold. These include:
 2010, an EMD GP40, ex-Milwaukee Road and patched "Bandit". As of December 28, 2021, it is sitting in Humboldt Yard in Minneapolis, Minnesota.
 4601, an EMD GP40, also sitting in Humboldt Yard as of December 28, 2021.
 4603, an EMD GP40, sitting in St Paul Yard in Saint Paul, Minnesota as of December 18, 2019.

Rail trails 
 The Soo Line Trail in Minnesota was created from former pieces of the railroad which has extended down into the Lake Wobegon Trail. The trails are enjoyed by walkers, runners, and bikers in the area, and are prized for how flat they are.

 The Copper Country Limited railroad lines in Michigan's Keweenaw Peninsula, along with former lines owned by the Copper Range Railroad, have been turned into ATV trails.  Some, like the 17-mile-long Jack Stevens Hancock-Calumet Trail, are multi-purpose and are enjoyably used by hikers and bikers year-round.

See also 
 Soo Line locomotives
 Soo Line Depot (disambiguation)

References

Bibliography

External links 
 Soo Line Historical and Technical Society's Website

 
Canadian Pacific Railway subsidiaries
Companies based in Minneapolis
North Dakota railroads
South Dakota railroads
Minnesota railroads
Wisconsin railroads
Illinois railroads
Indiana railroads
Michigan railroads
Defunct Kentucky railroads
Defunct Missouri railroads
Defunct Iowa railroads
Montana railroads
Railroads in the Chicago metropolitan area
Economy of the Midwestern United States
Predecessors of the Canadian Pacific Railway
Railway companies established in 1961
American companies established in 1961
Former Class I railroads in the United States